NYC Underground is a live album by saxophonist Johnny Griffin which was recorded at the Village Vanguard in 1979 and released on the Galaxy label in 1981.

Reception

The AllMusic review by Scott Yanow stated: "This Johnny Griffin quartet session, recorded live at the Village Vanguard, finds the distinctive tenor in generally exciting form".

Track listing
All compositions by Johnny Griffin, except where indicated.
 "Yours Is My Heart Alone" (Franz Lehár) – 7:33
 A Few Words from Johnny Griffin... – 0:35
 "Alone Again" – 11:32
 "Let Me Touch It" – 9:08
 "Sophisticated Lady" (Duke Ellington, Mitchell Parish, Irving Mills) – 6:20
 "Rhythm-a-Ning" (Thelonious Monk) – 4:11

Personnel
Johnny Griffin – tenor saxophone
Ronnie Mathews – piano
Ray Drummond – bass
Idris Muhammad – drums

References

Galaxy Records live albums
Johnny Griffin live albums
1981 live albums
Albums produced by Orrin Keepnews
Albums recorded at the Village Vanguard